This is a list of performances by Scottish actor David Tennant.

Film

Television

Narration

Short films

Stage

Audio

Video games

See also
List of awards and nominations received by David Tennant

References

External links
 

Male actor filmographies
British filmographies
Scottish filmographies